Bansko is a town in Bulgaria. Bansko (Cyrillic: Банско) may also refer to
PFC Bansko, a football club based in Bansko, Bulgaria
Bansko Municipality in Bulgaria
Bansko Peak in Antarctica
Bansko, North Macedonia, a village